Island Seaway is a ferry that once served the route between Adelaide and Kangaroo Island in South Australia.

The vessel was built in Port Adelaide by the Eglo Engineering Company, commencing service in 1987 in replacement of the Troubridge. It had a Gross Tonnage of 3,536 and a Net Tonnage of 1,680. 

In 1995 the vessel was sold to Malta.  It is now named Flying Viking and classified as an accommodation vessel.

References

Ferries of South Australia
Ships of South Australia